This is a list of the earliest films produced and released before 1960 in the British Malaya and Federation of Malaya (Colony of Singapore).

For an alphabetical listing of Malaysian films see :Category:Malaysian films.

1920s

1930s

1940s

1950s

External links
Malaysian film at the Internet Movie Database
Malaysian Feature Films Finas
Cinema Online Malaysia

1920s
Lists of 1920s films
Lists of 1930s films
Lists of 1940s films
Lists of 1950s films
Films
Films
Films
Films